Panther Creek is a stream in the Webster County, Missouri. It is a tributary of the James River.

The headwaters are adjacent to U. S. Route 60 between Fordland and Diggins.

Panther Creek was so named due to reports of panthers in the area.

See also
List of rivers of Missouri

References

Rivers of Webster County, Missouri
Rivers of Missouri